Percy Reed (5 December 1890 – 4 August 1970) was an English professional footballer who played as a half-back in the Football League for Sheffield Wednesday and Chesterfield and in non-League football for Royal Navy, Doncaster Rovers, Denaby United and York City.

References

1890 births
1970 deaths
Footballers from Sheffield
English footballers
Association football midfielders
Sheffield Wednesday F.C. players
Chesterfield F.C. players
Doncaster Rovers F.C. players
Denaby United F.C. players
York City F.C. players
English Football League players
Midland Football League players